CIOT-FM is a Canadian radio station that broadcasts a Christian music format at 104.1 FM in Nipawin, Saskatchewan. The station is branded as Lighthouse 104.1 and is owned by Wilderness Ministries Inc.

CIOT began broadcasting in 2004.

See also
Christian radio

References

External links
www.lighthousefm.ca - CIOT 104.1 FM
 

IOT
IOT
Radio stations established in 2004
2004 establishments in Saskatchewan